Dey was the title given to the rulers of the Regency of Algiers from 1671. It was also used in Tunisia between 1591-1860.

Dey may also refer to:

 Dey (month), the 10th month of the Iranian calendar
 Dollar Euro Yen, a proposed world currency

People with the given name Dey

 Dey Young (born 1955), American actress
 Robert Isaac Dey Gray ( 1772-1804), British-Canadian lawyer, judge and political figure

People with the surname Dey

 Anind Dey (born 1970), American computer scientist
 Bishnu Dey (1909-1982), Indian Bengali poet
 Claudia Dey (born  1972), Canadian dramatist
 Edgar Dey (1883-1912), Canadian ice hockey player
 Frederick Van Rensselaer Dey (1861-1922), American writer
 Graeme Dey (born 1962), Scottish politician
 Hussein Dey (1765-1838), Last dey of Algiers
 Joseph Dey (1907-1991), American golf administrator
 K. C. Dey (1893-1962), Indian Bengali actor, singer and music composer
 Krishanu Dey (1962-2003), Indian Bengali football player
 Lal Behari Dey (1824-1892), Indian Bengali journalist and author
 Manna Dey (1919-2013), Indian singer
 Manishi Dey (1906-1989), Indian Bengali artist
 Mukul Dey (1895-1989), Indian Bengali artist
 Peter A. Dey (1825-1911), American civil engineer
 Susan Dey (born 1952), American actress
 Tamal Dey (born 1964), Indian Bengali computer scientist and mathematician
 Ted Dey (1864-1943), Canadian ice hockey owner
 Tom Dey (born 1965), American film director, screenwriter, and producer
 Tracey Dey (born 1943), American  singer
 William Dey (1870-1921), Canadian ice hockey player

See also
 De (surname)
 Dey's (disambiguation)
 Dey Street
 The D.E.Y.